Gyemyeongsan is a mountain located in Chungju, North Chungcheong Province, South Korea.

Mount Gyemyeongsan guards the city of Chungju, and it is known for its beauty with its impressively-shaped Ambong Peaks. 

The park at Mount Gyemyeong sticks out toward Lake Chungju like a fist. This little mountaintop is known as Mount Simhang. Jongdaengi-gil is a forest road that circles Mount Simhang.

See also
Geography of Korea
List of mountains in Korea
List of mountains by elevation
Mountain portal
South Korea portal

References

Mountains of North Chungcheong Province
Chungju
Mountains of South Korea